Frank Giampietro is an American poet.  He is interim director of the Cleveland State University Poetry Center, visiting assistant professor of poetry at Cleveland State University, and the Northeast Ohio Master of Fine Arts Program (NEOMFA) program.  He is author of Begin Anywhere (Alice James Books, 2008). He was the 2010-2012 resident scholar at The Southern Review and has had poems, book reviews, and nonfiction published in many literary journals and magazines including 32 Poems, Cimarron Review Columbia Poetry Review, CutBank, Exquisite Corpse, Fence, Hayden's Ferry Review, Ploughshares, Cimarron Review and Rain Taxi. His honors include a 2008 Florida Book Award (a bronze medal in poetry), a fellowship from Sewanee Writers' Conference, and a Kingsbury Fellowship from Florida State University. He is creator and editor of two literary websites, La Fovea and Poems by Heart. 
Giampietro earned an MA from Washington College, an MFA from Vermont College of Fine Arts, and a PhD in English from Florida State University. He lives in Farmington, Maine with his wife, the potter, Cherie Giampietro and two children.

References

External links 
 Poems: Homestead Review > Spring 2003 > Two Poems by Frank Giampietro
 Video: Frank Giampietro Reads Death by My Son  at the Alice James Books Reading
 Interview: Writer’s Digest > Poetic Asides > June 1, 2009 > Interview with Frank Giampietro by Robert Lee Brewer
 Review: The Florida Book Review > A Review by Nick Vagnoni of Begin Anywhere by Frank Giampietro
 Audio: Frank Giampietro Reading from Begin Anywhere
 Author’s Website
 Alice James Books > Author Page > Frank Giampietro
 La Fovea Homepage
 Poems by Heart Homepage
 Photos: Washington College: Events | 2009 | Poet + Editor  = Book: Frank Giampietro & April Ossmann 

American male poets
Living people
Vermont College of Fine Arts alumni
Washington College alumni
People from Florida
Poets from Florida
Year of birth missing (living people)